Podvrh is a settlement in the Municipality of Sevnica in east-central Slovenia. It lies in the hills northeast of Sevnica in an area that was traditionally part of Styria. The municipality is now included in the Lower Sava Statistical Region.

References

External links
Podvrh at Geopedia

Populated places in the Municipality of Sevnica